The Battle of Mansura was fought near Mansura, Louisiana, on May 16, 1864, during the Red River Campaign of the American Civil War. A Union force defeated elements of the Confederate States Army.

Background
As Maj. Gen. Nathaniel P. Banks's Red River Expeditionary Force (from the Department of the Gulf) retreated down the Red River, Confederate forces under Maj. Gen. Richard Taylor attempted to slow the Union troops’ movements and, if possible, deplete their numbers or, better yet, destroy them. The Union forces passed Fort DeRussy, reached Marksville, and then continued east. At Mansura, Taylor massed his forces in an open prairie that controlled access to the three roads traversing the area, where he hoped his artillery could cause many casualties.

Battle

Early on the morning of May 16, the Union forces approached, and skirmishing quickly ensued. After a four-hour fight (principally an artillery duel), a large Union force massed for a flank attack, inducing the Confederates to fall back. The Union troops marched to Simmesport. Taylor's force harassed the enemy's retrograde movement, but was unable to halt it.

Notes

Sources
 CWSAC Report Update - Louisiana

Mansura
Mansura
Mansura
Mansura
Avoyelles Parish, Louisiana
1864 in Louisiana